Vladislav Sergeevich Korshunov (born 13 February 1983) is a Russian former rugby union player. He played as a hooker.
 
He played for VVA Saracens in Russia until 2010/11. He played a season for London Wasps, a professional team in England, participating as a replacement in the AVIVA Premiership and Anglo Welsh games, and as a starter in a European Challenge Cup match. However, at the end of the season it was announced that Korshunov was not going to be a part of the Wasps squad for the 2012-2013 season due to a financial accommodation. He returned to VVA Saracens for that season, where he has played until 2016/17, when he finished his career.

Korshunov had 75 caps for Russia, from 2002 to 2015, with 5 tries scored, 25 points in aggregate. He was the captain of the Russia side and was a key player in the team that achieved the qualification for the 2011 Rugby World Cup, in New Zealand, for the first time.

External links

Vladislav Korshunov International Statistics

1983 births
Living people
Russian rugby union players
Russia international rugby union players
Rugby union hookers
Russian expatriate rugby union players
Expatriate rugby union players in England
Russian expatriate sportspeople in England
Wasps RFC players
VVA Podmoskovye players